Lee Smith Bickmore (1908 – 1986) was an American businessman who was the CEO of Nabisco. Bickmore was also an active figure in the Church of Jesus Christ of Latter-day Saints in New York and New Jersey.

Early life and education 
Bickmore was born in Paradise, Utah. He graduated from Utah State University and completed the advanced management program at Harvard Business School.

Career 
Bickmore began his employment with Nabisco as a salesman in Pocatello, Idaho. For many years, while serving as an executive, he lived in Short Hills, New Jersey. He was living in Vero Beach, Florida at the time of his death.

Bickmore was a member of the Church of Jesus Christ of Latter-day Saints. After being president of Nabisco, he served for a time as special consultant to the First Presidency for business operations, finances, buildings, communication and other related matters. Prior to this point, Bickmore had held several positions in the LDS Church in New York and New Jersey in the Sunday School and Young Men, and served as a member of the New York New York Stake high council. Bickmore was a trustee of Brandeis University and Pace University.

In the 1960s Bickmore served as an associate to Brigham Young University's fundraising campaign.

Personal life 
Bickmore and his wife, Ellen McMinn Bickmor, had two daughters. Bickmore died in Vero Beach, Florida in 1986. He was previously a resident of Short Hills, New Jersey.

References

1908 births
People from Cache County, Utah
University of Utah alumni
Harvard Business School alumni
Brigham Young University people
People from Pocatello, Idaho
American chief executives of food industry companies
Latter Day Saints from Utah
1986 deaths
American salespeople
Latter Day Saints from New York (state)
Latter Day Saints from New Jersey
Latter Day Saints from Florida
People from Millburn, New Jersey
People from Vero Beach, Florida